The 2006 Ford 400 was the thirty-sixth stock car race of the 2006 NASCAR Nextel Cup Series, and the final round of the ten-race season-ending Chase for the Nextel Cup. It was held on November 19, 2006, in Homestead, Florida, at Homestead–Miami Speedway, before a crowd of 80,000 people. The circuit is an intermediate track that holds NASCAR races. The 267-lap race was won by Greg Biffle of Roush Fenway Racing, who started from the 22nd position. Martin Truex Jr. finished second for Dale Earnhardt, Inc., and Joe Gibbs Racing's Denny Hamlin was third.

Kasey Kahne won the 12th pole position of his career by posting the fastest lap in qualifying and he led the first 18 laps until Kyle Busch passed him. He retook the first position on the 47th lap, and led for a total of 90 laps, more than any other driver. Dale Earnhardt Jr. took the lead after not making a pit stop under a caution period, and held it until Martin Truex Jr. assumed the first position after Earnhardt had a slow pit stop due to a lug nut problem. Biffle passed Riggs for the lead, only ceding it to J. J. Yeley on pit stop rotation, before getting ahead of him with twelve laps to go to win his second race of the season, and the eleventh of his career. There were eleven cautions and fifteen lead changes among ten drivers during the race.

The final result of the race meant Jimmie Johnson, the points leader going into the race, won his first NASCAR Nextel Cup Series Drivers' Championship with a 56-point advantage over Matt Kenseth, his nearest rival. Hamlin's third-place finish meant he finished the season as the highest-placed rookie. In the Manufacturers' Championship, Chevrolet finished with a total of 279 points, 76 ahead of Dodge, and a further point in front of Ford.

Background 

The Ford 400 was the 36th of 36 scheduled stock car races of the 2006 NASCAR Nextel Cup Series, and the final round of the ten-race season-ending 2006 Chase for the Nextel Cup. It was held on November 19, 2006, in Homestead, Florida, at Homestead–Miami Speedway, an intermediate track that holds NASCAR races. The race was held on Homestead–Miami Speedway's standard track; a  four-turn oval track. The track's turns are banked from 18 to 20 degrees, while both the front stretch, the location of the finish line, and the back stretch are banked at three degrees.

Before the race Jimmie Johnson led the Drivers' Championship with 6,332 points, and Matt Kenseth was second. Denny Hamlin and Kevin Harvick tied for third and Dale Earnhardt Jr. rounded out the top five drivers competing for the 2006 Chase for the Nextel Cup. A maximum of 195 points were available for the final race, which meant Kenseth could still win the championship. Johnson need to finish twelfth to become the champion as, even if Kenseth won, Johnson would still be ahead of Kenseth. In the event that Kenseth won, and he and Johnson were tied on points, both drivers would have five wins, but Johnson would be the champion as he had more second-place finishes than Kenseth. Jeff Gordon, Jeff Burton, Mark Martin, Kasey Kahne completed the top ten. Chevrolet had already secured the Manufacturers' Championship, and entered the race on 273 points; Dodge was second with 199, followed by Ford with 193. Greg Biffle was the race's defending champion.

Johnson, runner-up in the 2004 championship, had been second in points entering the past three races at Homestead, and stated his strategy was to finish ahead of his rivals, "I can't express enough how much experience in this sport has helped me as a driver. My fifth year, fifth time being in a championship situation … We’ve been under pressure and we’ve been in this situation and we are a better, stronger, more mature race team from it. I think the last few months, we’ve been able to show that." Kenseth said his only chance at taking his second championship was if Johnson failed to finish, and was not optimistic due to his recent streak of poor performances, "He's going to have to have problems, and we're going to have to have a lot of good luck to get in there. We can't do it on performance. We can't run 25th on performance right now."

Two drivers made their first attempts at qualifying for a race in the season. After announcing his departure from Formula One in July 2006, Juan Pablo Montoya was confirmed as participating in the Ford 400 for Chip Ganassi Racing in its  30 car as preparation for his full-time Nextel Cup Series debut for the 2007 season after team owner Chip Ganassi filed an additional entry for the event. For Homestead, Brewco Motorsports extended its relationship with its Busch Series driver Casey Atwood to attempt to qualify for the team's second race in the Nextel Cup Series, and Atwood's first since he raced for Evernham Motorsports in the 2003 season.

Practice and qualifying 
Three practice sessions were held before the Sunday race; one on Friday and two on Saturday. The first session lasted 90 minutes, the second 60 minutes and the third 35 minutes. In the first practice session, Kurt Busch was fastest with a time of 30.366 seconds, ahead of Elliott Sadler in second, and David Stremme third. Burton was fourth-fastest, Biffle placed fifth, and Kahne sixth. Brian Vickers, Ryan Newman, Martin, and Scott Riggs rounded out the session's top ten drivers. During the session, Dale Jarrett crashed into a trackside wall. He switched to a back-up car for the qualifying session held later that day.

Fifty-six cars were entered in the qualifier on Friday afternoon; according to NASCAR's qualifying procedure, forty-three were allowed to race. Each driver ran two laps, with the starting order determined by the competitor's fastest times. Morgan Shepherd withdrew from the event prior to qualifying due to irreparable structural damage to his car from an accident in the first practice session. Kahne took his sixth pole position of the season, and the 12th of his career with a time of 30.293 seconds, equalling Kurt Busch's total of pole positions won in 2006. He was joined on the grid's front row by Riggs, his Evernham Motorsports teammate, who recorded a lap seven-thousands of a second slower. Kyle Busch qualified in third, Sadler took fourth, and Burton began from fifth. Vickers, Harvick, J. J. Yeley, David Gilliland, and Clint Bowyer completed the top ten starters. Johnson, a Chase for the Nextel Cup driver, qualified 13th, while Kenseth, another chase driver, set the 19th-fastest lap. 43rd-placed qualifier Bill Elliott used a champion's provisional to qualify for the race. On his second lap, Robby Gordon's engine failed, and he changed engines. The twelve drivers who failed to qualify were Ward Burton, Brandon Whitt, Atwood, Kenny Wallace, Todd Kluever, David Ragan, Michael Waltrip, Mike Skinner, Derrike Cope, Kevin Lepage, Carl Long, and Chad Chaffin. After qualifying, Kahne said, "The engine package we brought here is very strong and the Dodge Chargers are working well. We'll see what happens, but it's pretty nice to have all three cars up front."

With a time of 31.317 seconds, Casey Mears was fastest in the second practice session on Saturday afternoon. Harvick set the second-quickest lap time and Newman was third. Fourth went to Burton, Scott Wimmer came fifth, and Kyle Busch was sixth. Kahne, Bowyer, Vickers, and Johnson occupied positions seven through ten. Hamlin was the highest-placed Chase driver outside of the top ten in 12th, and Earnhardt recorded the 19th fastest time. At the end of the second practice session, Travis Kvapil's engine failed. Later that day, Burton paced the final practice session with a lap of 31.229 seconds; Newman improved his performance for second, and Kahne was third. Martin was fourth-fastest, Kenseth fifth, and his championship rival Johnson sixth. Hamlin placed seventh, Robby Gordon eighth, Mears ninth, and Dave Blaney tenth.

Qualifying results

Race 

Live television coverage of the race began at 14:01 Eastern Standard Time (UTC+04:00) in the United States on NBC. Jenna Edwards, Miss Florida USA 2007, began pre-race ceremonies with an invocation. American Idol season five winner and blues rock singer Taylor Hicks performed the national anthem, and Ford board of directors member Edsel Ford II commanded the drivers to start their engines. During the pace laps, Bowyer and Robby Gordon moved to the back of the grid because of engine changes.

The race commenced at 15:11 local time but one lap was deduced from its scheduled distance because NASCAR located debris on the track between the first and second corners. Kahne maintained the lead going into turn one. Riggs was passed by Kyle Busch for third but the latter fell to fourth on lap two. After starting 15th, Johnson moved to eleventh by the start of the fifth lap. Two laps later, Kurt Busch made contact with the wall on the backstretch leaving turn two, ricocheted off it, and Bobby Labonte ran into the rear of his car, causing the first caution to be displayed. During the caution, 23 drivers elected to make pit stops for adjustments to their cars. Kahne held the lead at the lap-12 restart, followed by his teammate Riggs, Burton, and Kyle Busch. On the next lap, Kyle Busch passed Riggs for second. Two laps later, the second caution was shown: a flat tire caused Kurt Busch to lose control of his car, and clout the wall leaving turn four, littering the track with debris. Under caution, more drivers chose to make pit stops. Johnson had a hole at the front of his car punctured by debris from Kurt Busch's car repaired.

Racing resumed on lap 19 with Kahne being overtaken by Kyle Busch for the lead, and he then fell behind his teammate Riggs for third. Montoya made minor contact with Mears and Earnhardt, and picked up a flat left-front tire on lap 22. By the 30th lap, the lead of Kyle Busch over Riggs was 0.170 seconds, as Johnson advanced to 26th after restarting 40th. Johnson moved further through the pack to 20th place by lap 40. Five laps later, a spring rubber was located on the backstretch groove, prompting the third caution. During the caution, the leaders (including Kyle Busch), made pit stops for car adjustments. At the lap 50-restart, Kahne led the field back up to speed. He extended his lead over Kyle Busch to 0.994 seconds by the 65th lap. Johnson got into tenth on lap 79, and he overtook Harvick for ninth on the lap after a short battle. On lap 94, Earnhardt moved into sixth place, and he then got ahead of Gilliland and Kenseth to advance into fourth. Green flag pit stops began on lap 104, and concluded on lap 109, with Kahne retaining the lead.

Kyle Busch got loose, and made contact with a wall, losing some places, and then made heavy contact with the turn two wall with the right-hand side of his car on lap 116, causing the fourth caution. Several drivers, including Kahne, made pit stops for fuel and tires under caution. Earnhardt did not make a pit stop, and led at the lap-120 restart. Eleven laps later, Martin Truex Jr. was passed by Biffle for second, as Earnhardt pulled away from the remainder of the field after holding off multiple challenges for the lead. The fifth caution came out on lap 160 when Blaney's left-rear tire burst, and scattered debris across the track. During the caution, multiple drivers (including Earnhardt) elected to enter pit road for tire changes and car adjustments. Earnhardt had a slow stop because of a rear lug nut problem, and Truex led at the restart on lap 166. A sixth caution came out as Gilliland clouted the turn one wall. He then lost control of his car, and hit the wall two corners later. Some cars made pit stops but not those in the top 13 positions.

Racing continued on lap 179 as Truex led from Kahne, and Biffle. Two laps later, Johnson drew alongside Kenseth but he could not make the pass for fifth. He did succeed on the next lap until Kenseth retook the position on lap 183. That lap, Bowyer overtook Johnson for sixth. On lap 188, Robby Gordon crashed leaving the fourth turn, and spun 360 degrees, as Johnson steered left to avoid hitting him, activating the seventh caution. Under the caution, multiple drivers (including Truex), elected to make pit stops for tires and car adjustments. Sadler did not make a pit stop and led at the lap-194 restart. Johnson fell to 15th as several drivers began to prepare themselves for several green flag racing laps on the 197th lap. On lap 206, Mike Bliss' engine failed, laying oil on the track, and triggering the eighth caution. Several cars, including Sadler, went to pit road for tires and fuel. Kahne won the race off pit road to retake the lead for the lap 210 restart. Kahne's teammate Riggs overtook him at the start-finish line to move into the lead on the lap. The following lap, Riggs lost the lead to Kahne.

Biffle passed his teammate Kenseth for third on lap 212, and then Riggs for second on the next lap. He overtook Kahne to lead for the first time on the 214th lap. On lap 225, Earnhardt scraped the wall with his car's right-hand side going through turn two, but continued in 12th place. Johnson moved to eighth place by the 243rd lap, and did not require another pit stop. Lap 247 had the ninth caution; Newman's left-rear tire was cut from contact with Montoya, and he slid through some grass on the backstretch. The leaders (including Biffle) elected to make pit stops for tires under caution. Yeley stayed on the track to lead at the lap 252 restart. That lap, Newman ran into the rear of Montoya's car in turn one, causing the latter to hit the turn one wall heavily, and his car caught fire due to a ruptured fuel cell, as it drifted toward the infield. Montoya was uninjured. A tenth caution was displayed for three laps, until race officials showed a red flag for seven minutes and 58 seconds for track cleanup as cars stopped on the turn three banking.

Yeley led at the restart on lap 257 though he was passed soon after by Biffle on his left. On the following lap, Yeley lost second to Kahne. Johnson was overtaken by Harvick for seventh on the 259th lap, and Hamlin got ahead of Yeley to move into third place. On lap 262, the eleventh (and final) caution came out when Mears' engine failed, laying oil on the track. During the caution, Yeley stopped on the backstretch because his car had run out of fuel on the 265th lap. Biffle got the race back underway on the lap 267 restart. That lap, Kahne was passed by Truex for second. Biffle held the lead for the remaining two laps to take his second victory of the season, and the eleventh of his career. Truex finished second, Hamlin third, Kahne fourth, and Harvick fifth. Kenseth took sixth, Riggs came seventh, and Edwards placed eighth. Johnson finished ninth to win his first NASCAR Nextel Cup Series Championship. Bowyer rounded out the top ten finishers. There were fifteen lead changes among ten drivers during the course of the race. Kahne led for a total of 90 laps, more than any other driver. Biffle led twice for a total of 47 laps.

Post-race comments 

Biffle appeared in victory lane to celebrate his second victory of the season in front of a crowd of 80,000 spectators; the win earned him $323,800. He said the win made up for the struggles he had during the season and praised his car for helping him claim victory, "It does a lot for us, Everybody knows this has been a tough year for us. It seems like we haven't been in the right place at the right time and then haven't had fast enough race cars and have had mechanical failures." Truex was enjoyed that a fast car enabled him to run strongly for most of the event, "It's been a pretty tough season. The last few months we've really come together and had some good runs and just to be able to close the deal, feels really good." Third-placed Hamlin was not disappointed over not winning the championship, "I figured we just fell back to fifth or sixth in points and who knows where we were going to end up, I was angry at the time, but I settled myself back down. It's been a great year for us," Hamlin said. "I'm ecstatic the way we ran. This is the way I wanted to end the year is with a top-five finish [because] these guys deserve it."

Afterward, Johnson began celebrating his first Nextel Cup Series championship. He said of his achievement, "I think we knew in our hearts we could do it all along, we just got into some bad luck at the beginning. That's what let us get the momentum, let us sleep well at night, is because we knew this team was capable of winning a championship. We just had to have some good luck." His crew chief Chad Knaus commented on the pressure the No. 48 team faced, "This team has really come into its own the last year. We've had to battle back from a lot of weird stuff. I'm more happy for my guys than for myself." Kenseth expressed disappointment over his performance during the Chase for the Nextel Cup but was pleased to finish as runner-up to Johnson, "If we had run in the Chase like we did in August, we would have been 200 points clear before Homestead,  If you look at all the problems people had in the Chase and we didn't have any, that was dragging me down. But this is probably one of the best seasons I've ever had. I won four races, and we could have won eight or nine."

After the race, Newman and his crew chief Matt Borland were summoned to meet NASCAR officials for his accident with Montoya on lap 252 so that they could query the pair on whether the contact was done purposefully. Montoya said of the crash after leaving the circuit's infield care center, "It's one of those things that happens in racing. The Texaco/Havoline Dodge was a great car today. Everybody worked so hard on this racecar. It's a shame. It's a fast racecar." According to Newman, Montoya's car came across the front of his, "I felt bad for the situation because, obviously, it looked like I was retaliating, but that's not the case. That's what we just talked about."

In the Drivers' Championship, Johnson finished first with 6,475 points, 56 ahead of his nearest rival Kenseth in second. Hamlin followed as the highest-placed rookie in third with 6,407 points. Harvick and Earnhardt were fourth and fifth with 6,397 and 6,328 points respectively, and Jeff Gordon, Burton, Kahne, Martin, and Kyle Busch rounded out the top ten drivers in the final Chase for the Nextel Cup standings. Chevrolet won the Manufacturers' Championship with 279 points. Dodge was 76 points behind in second, and Ford was a further point behind in third. The race took three hours, 12 minutes, and 23 seconds to complete, and the margin of victory was 0.389 seconds.

Race results

Standings after the race 

 Note: Only the top ten positions are included for the driver standings. These drivers qualified for the Chase for the Nextel Cup.

References

External links 
 

Ford
Ford 400
NASCAR races at Homestead-Miami Speedway
November 2006 sports events in the United States